Timotheos Themelis (1878–1955) was a clergyman who served as Archbishop of Jordan and later Greek Orthodox Patriarch of Jerusalem.

Born in Samos, Greece in 1878, Themelis was a graduate of the School of the Holy Cross in Jerusalem, and studied at Oxford University for four years. In 1931 he founded the theological quarterly New Zion. In 1947 he was appointed Knight of the British Empire for "his services in bringing the Christian communities of the Holy Land into closer cooperation." He was also an author, writing fifteen volumes on "theological subjects."

References 

20th-century Greek Orthodox Patriarchs of Jerusalem
1878 births
1955 deaths
Members of the Order of the British Empire